The 1933 Navy Midshipmen football team represented the United States Naval Academy during the 1933 college football season. In their third season under head coach Edgar Miller, the Midshipmen compiled a 5–4 record and outscored their opponents by a combined score of

Schedule

References

Navy
Navy Midshipmen football seasons
Navy Midshipmen football